The 2009 TeleChoice Premier League season was the ninth season of the revamped National Premier Leagues NSW. This season also marked the addition of the Bonnyrigg White Eagles Football Club, promoted from the Super League.

The 2009 regular season began on 1 March, and concluded on 9 August. The Finals series commenced a fortnight later. On 13 September the Sutherland Sharks Football Club won their second championship of the year when they defeated Marconi Stallions 4–1 in the Grand Final at CUA Stadium.

During the course of the season, all Premier League, Super League and Division teams were involved in the TigerTurf Cup, an equivalent to the English FA Cup with teams competing in a series of elimination games. On 16 August the Sutherland Sharks Football Club were crowned the Cup Champions after defeating Manly United FC 1–0.

Clubs
Teams promoted from Super League:
(After the end of the 2008 season.)
Bonnyrigg White Eagles

Teams relegated to Super League:
(After the end of the 2008 season.)
Macarthur Rams

Managerial changes

Regular season

League table

Results
The results of the 2009 Home and Away season are as follows:

Finals series

First Week

Second week

Preliminary final

Grand Final

Statistics

Top goalscorers

Scoring
First hat-trick of the season: Jamie McMaster (Sydney Tigers) against Bonnyrigg (1 March)
Most goals scored by one player in a match: 4 goals – Robert Younis (Sydney Tigers) against Wollongong, (9 August)
Widest winning margin: 7 goals – Marconi 7–0 Wollongong (19 April)
Most goals in a match: 11 goals
Sydney Tigers 6–5 Wollongong (9 August)
All season goals (excluding finals): 404 goals

Clean sheets
Most clean sheets – Sutherland (9)
Fewest clean sheets – Wollongong (0)

Attendances
The table is for the home and away season and does not include finals series attendances.

Awards

Gold medal dinner
At the end of the season, Football NSW hosted the Gold Medal Dinner, where players, coaches and referees were awarded for their work throughout the Premier League season.

{| class="wikitable"
|-
! Award !! Name!! Club 
|-
| Player of the Year || Brad Boardman || Sutherland Sharks 
|-
| Andreas Golden Boot || Matthew Mayora || Sydney Olympic
|-
| Goalkeeper of the Year || Vedran Janjetovic || Sydney United
|-
| Coach of the Year || Ante Milicic || Sydney United
|-
| Referee of the Year || Peter Vrtkovski || –
|}

All-Stars Team

Based on a points system in which all match reporters took part in during the course of the 22 rounds, eleven players were selected in various positions highlighting their performances for the season.Goalkeeper: Vedran Janjetovic (Sydney United)Defence: Michael Robinson (Sutherland Sharks), Shane Webb (Bankstown City Lions), Joe Vrkic (Sydney United), Richard Luksic (Bankstown City Lions)Midfield: Scott Thomas (Manly United), Ali Abbas Al-Hilfi (Marconi Stallions), Panni Nikas (Sutherland Sharks), Alexander Canak (Marconi Stallions)Attack: Brad Boardman (Sutherland Sharks), Luka Glavas (Sydney United)Coach:''' Ante Milicic (Sydney United)

See also
National Premier Leagues NSW
Football NSW

References

External links
NSW Premier League Official Website

2009 in Australian soccer
2009
2009 domestic association football leagues